Coffee County is a county located in the southeastern part of the U.S. state of Alabama.  As of the 2020 census, the population was 53,465. Its name is in honor of General John Coffee.

Coffee County comprises the Enterprise, Micropolitan Statistical Area, which was originally Enterprise–Ozark micropolitan area in 2010 censuses before being split off. It was originally included in the Dothan-Enterprise-Ozark, Combined Statistical Area in its 2012 statistics but the area in its recent years has been separated from the Dothan metropolitan area and Ozark micropolitan area in later censuses and is its own primary statistical area now.  Despite the census change of the statistics by the United States Census Bureau, the county still remains culturally connected alongside the two core based areas as it is commonly described as part of what is called the Wiregrass region together and also it shares its locations of United States army base, Fort Rucker. The county seat is mostly known as Elba, although Enterprise contains a second county courthouse as well.

History
The land in Coffee County was originally part of Dale County, which was incorporated in 1824. Coffee County was formed from the western part of Dale County on December 29, 1841.  It was named after John R. Coffee, a soldier in the Creek War of 1813—14. The first county seat was in Wellborn. After the courthouse was destroyed by fire in 1851, the county seat was moved to Elba.

Geography
The county is located in the Wiregrass region of southeast Alabama.

Major highways

 U.S. Highway 84
 U.S. Highway 231
 State Route 27
 State Route 51
 State Route 87
 State Route 88
 State Route 92
 State Route 134
 State Route 189
 State Route 192

Adjacent counties
Pike County (north)
Dale County (east)
Geneva County (south)
Covington County (west)
Crenshaw County (northwest)

Demographics

2020 census

As of the 2020 United States census, there were 53,465 people, 19,924 households, and 13,747 families residing in the county.

2010 census
As of the census of 2010, there were 49,948 people, 19,849 households, and 13,837 families residing in the county. The population density was 74 people per square mile (29/km2). There were 22,330 housing units at an average density of 33 per square mile (12.7/km2). The racial makeup of the county was 74.7% White, 16.7% Black or African American, 1.3% Native American, 1.3% Asian, 0.2% Pacific Islander, 3.2% from other races, and 2.5% from two or more races. 6.4% of the population were Hispanic or Latino of any race.

The largest self-reported ancestry groups in Coffee County were English (59.9%), German (4.4%), Irish (3.3%), "American" (3.1%), (1.8%), Scottish (1.2%) and Portuguese (1.0%).

There were 19,849 households, out of which 30.1% had children under the age of 18 living with them, 52.6% were married couples living together, 12.9% had a female householder with no husband present, and 30.3% were non-families. 25.4% of all households were made up of individuals, and 9.8% had someone living alone who was 65 years of age or older. The average household size was 2.49 and the average family size was 2.98.

In the county, the population was spread out, with 24.2% under the age of 18, 8.6% from 18 to 24, 27.1% from 25 to 44, 25.7% from 45 to 64, and 14.4% who were 65 years of age or older. The median age was 37.6 years. For every 100 females, there were 97.7 males. For every 100 females age 18 and over, there were 101.3 males.

The median income for a household in the county was $42,253, and the median income for a family was $54,929. Males had a median income of $41,635 versus $29,082 for females. The per capita income for the county was $22,797. About 14.1% of families and 17.2% of the population were below the poverty line, including 26.4% of those under age 18 and 13.4% of those age 65 or over.

Government
Coffee County is reliably Republican at the presidential level. The last Democrat to win the county in a presidential election is Jimmy Carter, who won it by a majority in 1976.

Communities

Cities
Elba (county seat)
Enterprise (partly in Dale County)

Towns
Kinston
New Brockton

Unincorporated communities

Alberton
Basin
Battens Crossroads
Brooklyn
Central City
Clintonville
Curtis
Damascus
Danleys Crossroads
Frisco
Goodman
Ino
Jack
Java
Keyton
Pine Level
Richburg
Roeton
Tabernacle
Victoria

Education
School districts include:
 Coffee County School District
 Elba City School District
 Enterprise City School District

Fort Rucker residents are within the Department of Defense Education Activity (DoDEA) system, for elementary school. Students on-post in Fort Rucker beyond the elementary level may attend non-DoDEA schools for secondary levels, with an on-post family choosing one of the following three options: Enterprise City, Daleville City School System, or Ozark City Schools.

Notable people
Jim Folsom, governor of Alabama from 1947 to 1951 and 1955 to 1959, was born in Coffee County.
Coffee County is home to "The Dancing Ghost" of Grancer Harrison, featured in the book 13 Alabama Ghosts and Jeffrey.
Alex Ríos, Major League Baseball player born in Coffee County
Zig Ziglar, Christian motivational speaker, was born in Coffee County in 1926.

In popular culture
The county is referred to in Joe David Brown's 1971 novel Addie Pray, which inspired the movie Paper Moon.

See also
National Register of Historic Places listings in Coffee County, Alabama
Properties on the Alabama Register of Landmarks and Heritage in Coffee County, Alabama

References

External links
 Official Website of Coffee County Government

 
Enterprise–Ozark micropolitan area
1841 establishments in Alabama
Populated places established in 1841